The North Pacific High is a semi-permanent, subtropical anticyclone located in the northeastern portion of the Pacific Ocean, located northeast of Hawaii and west of California. It is strongest during the northern hemisphere summer and shifts towards the equator during the winter, when the Aleutian Low becomes more active. It is responsible for California's typically dry summer and fall and typically wet winter and spring, as well as Hawaii's year-round trade winds.

During the 2011–2017 California drought, the North Pacific High persisted longer than usual, due to a mass of warm water in the Pacific Ocean, resulting in the Ridiculously Resilient Ridge. This significantly limited the number of powerful winter storms that were able to reach California, resulting in historic drought conditions in that state for several years.

See also

 South Pacific High
 North Pacific Current
 California Current
 El Niño–Southern Oscillation

References

External links
 
 

Regional climate effects
Pacific Ocean
Anticyclones